Leonard Bernard Myers, Jr. (December 18, 1978 – February 17, 2017) was a professional American football cornerback drafted in the sixth round of the 2001 NFL Draft by the New England Patriots of the National Football League (NFL).

Myers earned a Super Bowl ring with the Patriots in 2001.

He died of cancer on February 17, 2017, at age 38.

References

External links
NFL.com player page

1978 births
2017 deaths
Players of American football from Fort Lauderdale, Florida
American football cornerbacks
New England Patriots players
New Orleans Saints players
New York Jets players
Detroit Lions players
American players of Canadian football
Canadian football defensive backs
Ottawa Renegades players
Deaths from cancer in Florida